Greenpoint was the terminal train station for the Evergreen Branch of the Long Island Rail Road. Greenpoint station opened on May 15, 1879 and was located at the intersection of Quay Street and Franklin Street at Greenpoint. A ferry connected with trains at the station operating across the East River to 23 Street in Manhattan. Greenpoint had one island platform. The station closed on September 28, 1885.

References

External links
EVERGREEN BRANCH: another lost LIRR line (Forgotten New York)
Bushwick Branch Approximation
Arrts Archives THE L.I.R.R.'S  EVERGREEN BRANCH

Former Long Island Rail Road stations in New York City
Railway stations closed in 1885
Railway stations in the United States opened in 1878
Railway stations in Brooklyn
Greenpoint, Brooklyn